Comoros competed at the 2018 Summer Youth Olympics in Buenos Aires, Argentina from 6 October to 18 October 2018.

Competitors

Athletics

Boys

Girls

Swimming

Comoros qualified 1 girl for the competition. 

Girls

References

2018 in Comorian sport
Nations at the 2018 Summer Youth Olympics
Comoros at the Youth Olympics